Everything Is Broken is the second and final EP by American alternative rock band the Age of Information, and is the first release by the band under that name.  After the band's unreleased debut More Than This the band adopted a more electric sound for this EP and its follow-up.  The title of the EP is derived from a lyric in the chorus of the first track, "Knowledge".

Reception
There was only one notable review of the EP, when AlbumBuzz game it 4 stars out-of 4.  It was also well-received on auction sites.  However, the EP did not meet without criticism, as fans of Trading Yesterday were overwhelmingly disappointed ever since David Hodges announced that "Trading Yesterday was dead."  Fans overwhelmingly stated that the band did their best work as Trading Yesterday.

Track listing

Personnel
The Age of Information
 David Hodges - piano, vocals, guitar
 Steven McMorran - bass, backing vocals
 Josh Dunahoo - guitar
 Will "Science" Hunt - drums

References

2007 debut EPs
The Age of Information albums